Văn Giang is a township and capital of Văn Giang District, Hưng Yên Province, Vietnam.

References

Populated places in Hưng Yên province
District capitals in Vietnam
Townships in Vietnam